Kamosowo  (German: Kamissow) is a village in the administrative district of Gmina Białogard, within Białogard County, West Pomeranian Voivodeship, in north-western Poland.

For the history of the region, see History of Pomerania.

Notable residents
 Moritz Franz Kasimir von Wobersnow (1708–1759), Prussian general

References

Kamosowo